Cyclin-dependent kinase 2, also known as cell division protein kinase 2, or Cdk2, is an enzyme that in humans is encoded by the CDK2 gene. The protein encoded by this gene is a member of the cyclin-dependent kinase family of Ser/Thr protein kinases. This protein kinase is highly similar to the gene products of S. cerevisiae cdc28, and S. pombe cdc2, also known as Cdk1 in humans. It is a catalytic subunit of the cyclin-dependent kinase complex, whose activity is restricted to the G1-S phase of the cell cycle, where cells make proteins necessary for mitosis and replicate their DNA. This protein associates with and is regulated by the regulatory subunits of the complex including cyclin E or A. Cyclin E binds G1 phase Cdk2, which is required for the transition from G1 to S phase while binding with Cyclin A is required to progress through the S phase. Its activity is also regulated by phosphorylation. Multiple alternatively spliced variants and multiple transcription initiation sites of this gene have been reported. The role of this protein in G1-S transition has been recently questioned as cells lacking Cdk2 are reported to have no problem during this transition.

Dispensability in normally functioning tissue 
Original cell-culture based experiments demonstrated cell cycle arrest at the G1-S transition resulting from the deletion of Cdk2. Later experiments showed that Cdk2 deletions lengthened the G1 phase of the cell cycle in mouse embryo fibroblasts. However, they still entered S phase after this period and were able to complete the remaining phases of the cell cycle. When Cdk2 was deleted in mice, the animals remained viable despite a reduction in body size. However, meiotic function of both male and female mice was inhibited. This suggests that Cdk2 is non-essential for the cell cycle of healthy cells, but essential for meiosis and reproduction. Cells in Cdk2 knockout mice likely undergo fewer divisions, contributing to the reduction in body size. Germ cells also stop dividing at prophase of meiosis, leading to reproductive sterility.  Cdk1 is now believed to compensate for many aspects of Cdk2 deletion, except for meiotic function.

Mechanism of activation 
Cyclin-dependent kinase 2 is structured in two lobes. The lobe beginning at the N-terminus (N-lobe) contains many beta sheets, while the C-terminus lobe (C-lobe) is rich in alpha helices.  Cdk2 is capable of binding to many different cyclins, including cyclins A, B, E, and possibly C. Recent studies suggest Cdk2 binds preferentially to cyclins A and E, while Cdk1 prefers cyclins A and B.

Cdk2 becomes active when a cyclin protein (either A or E) binds at the active site located between the N and C lobes of the kinase. Due to the location of the active site, partner cyclins interact with both lobes of Cdk2. Cdk2 contains an important alpha helix located in the C lobe of the kinase, called the C-helix or the PSTAIRE-helix. Hydrophobic interactions cause the C-helix to associate with another helix in the activating cyclin. Activation induces a conformational change where the helix rotates and moves closer to the N-lobe. This allows the glutamic acid located on the C-helix to form an ion pair with a nearby lysine side chain. The significance of this movement is that it brings the side
chain of Glu 51, which belongs to a triad of catalytic site residues
conserved in all eukaryotic kinases, into the catalytic site. This
triad (Lys 33, Glu 51 and Asp 145) is involved in ATP phosphate
orientation and magnesium coordination, and is thought to be
critical for catalysis. This conformational change also relocates the activation loop to the C-lobe, revealing the ATP binding site now available for new interactions. Finally, the Threonine-160 residue is exposed and phosphorylated as the C-lobe activation segment is displaced from the catalytic site and the threonine residue is no longer sterically hindered. The phosphorylated threonine residue creates stability in the final enzyme conformation. It is important to note that throughout this activation process, cyclins binding to Cdk2 do not undergo any conformational change.

Role in DNA replication 
The success of the cell division process is dependent on the precise regulation of processes at both cellular and tissue levels. Complex interactions between proteins and DNA within the cell allow genomic DNA to be passed to daughter cells. Interactions between cells and extracellular matrix proteins allow new cells to be incorporated into existing tissues. At the cellular level,  the process is controlled by different levels of cyclin-dependent kinases (Cdks) and their partner cyclins. Cells utilize various checkpoints as a means of delaying cell cycle progression until it can repair defects.

Cdk2 is active during G1 and S phase of the cell cycle, and therefore acts as a G1-S phase checkpoint control. Prior to G1 phase, levels of Cdk4 and Cdk6 increase along with cyclin D. This allows for the partial phosphorylation of Rb, and partial activation of E2F at the beginning of G1 phase, which promotes cyclin E synthesis and increased Cdk2 activity. At the end of G1 phase, the Cdk2/Cyclin E complex reaches maximum activity and plays a significant role in the initiation of S phase. Other non-Cdk proteins also become active during the G1-S phase transition. For example, the retinoblastoma (Rb) and p27 proteins are phosphorylated by Cdk2 – cyclin A/E complexes, fully deactivating them. This allows E2F transcription factors to express genes that promote entry into S phase where DNA is replicated prior to division. Additionally, NPAT, a known substrate of the Cdk2-Cyclin E complex, functions to activate histone gene transcription when phosphorylated. This increases the synthesis of histone proteins (the major protein component of chromatin), and subsequently supports the DNA replication stage of the cell cycle. Finally, at the end of S phase, the ubiquitin proteasome degrades cyclin E.

Cancer cell proliferation 
Although Cdk2 is mostly dispensable in the cell cycle of normally functioning cells, it is critical to the abnormal growth processes of cancer cells. The CCNE1 gene produces cyclin E, one of the two major protein binding partners of Cdk2. Overexpression of CCNE1 occurs in many tumor cells, causing the cells to become dependent on Cdk2 and cyclin E. Abnormal cyclin E activity is also observed in breast, lung, colorectal, gastric, and bone cancers, as well as in leukemia and lymphoma. Likewise, abnormal expression of cyclin A2 is associated with chromosomal instability and tumor proliferation, while inhibition leads to decreased tumor growth. Therefore, CDK2 and its cyclin binding partners represent possible therapeutic targets for new cancer therapeutics. Pre-clinical models have shown preliminary success in limiting tumor growth, and have also been observed to reduce side effects of current chemotherapy drugs.

Identifying selective Cdk2 inhibitors is difficult due to the extreme similarity between the active sites of Cdk2 and other Cdks, especially Cdk1. Cdk1 is the only essential cyclin dependent kinase in the cell cycle, and inhibition could lead to unintended side effects. Most CDK2 inhibitor candidates target the ATP binding site and can be divided into two main subclasses: type I and type II. Type I inhibitors competitively target the ATP binding site in its active state. Type II inhibitors target CDK2 in its unbound state, either occupying the ATP binding site or hydrophobic pocket within the kinase. Type II inhibitors are believed to be more selective. Recently, the availability of new CDK crystal structures led to the identification of a potential allosteric binding site near the C-helix. Inhibitors of this allosteric site are classified as type III inhibitors. Another possible target is the T-loop of CDK2. When cyclin A binds to CDK2, the N-terminal lobe rotates to activate the ATP binding site and switch the position of the activation loop, called the T-loop.

Inhibitors
Interpretation of dynamic simulations and binding free energy studies unveiled that Ligand2 (Out of 17 in-house synthesized pyrrolone-fused benzosuberene (PBS) compounds) has a stable and equivalent free energy to Flavopiridol, SU9516, and CVT-313 inhibitors. Ligand2 scrutinized as a selective inhibitor of CDK2 without off-target binding (CDK1 and CDK9) based on ligand efficiency and binding affinity.  

Known CDK inhibitors are p21Cip1 (CDKN1A) and p27Kip1 (CDKN1B).

Drugs that inhibit Cdk2 and arrest the cell cycle, such as GW8510 and the experimental cancer drug seliciclib, may reduce the sensitivity of the epithelium to many cell cycle-active antitumor agents and, therefore, represent a strategy for prevention of chemotherapy-induced alopecia.

Rosmarinic acid methyl ester is a plant-derived Cdk2 inhibitor, which was shown to suppress proliferation of vascular smooth muscle cells and to reduce neointima formation in mouse restenosis model.

See also the PDB gallery below showing interactions with many inhibitors (inc Purvalanol B)

Gene regulation
In melanocytic cell types, expression of the CDK2 gene is regulated by the Microphthalmia-associated transcription factor.

Interactions 
Cyclin-dependent kinase 2 has been shown to interact with:

 BRCA1, 
 CDK2AP1, 
 CDKN1B 
 CDKN3, 
 CEBPA, 
 Cyclin A1, 
 Cyclin E1, 
 Flap structure-specific endonuclease 1, 
 ORC1L, 
 P21,
 PPM1B, 
 PPP2CA, 
 Retinoblastoma-like protein 1, 
 Retinoblastoma-like protein 2,  and
 SKP2.

References

Further reading

External links 
 
 
 

Cell cycle
Proteins
EC 2.7.11
Cell cycle regulators